La Sterza is a village in Tuscany, central Italy, administratively a frazione of the comuni of Lajatico and Terricciola, province of Pisa. At the time of the 2001 census its population was 91.

La Sterza is about 44 km from Pisa, 3 km from Lajatico and 6 km from Terricciola.

Notable residents 
 Andrea Bocelli, singer, born in La Sterza.

References 

Frazioni of the Province of Pisa